PS 144 Col. Jeromus Remsen School is a local elementary school in Forest Hills, Queens, New York City.  The zoned middle school for PS 144 is J.H.S. 190 Russell Sage.

History 
PS 144 originally opened in 1931. Due to overcrowding, a project to expand PS 144 was commenced in 2017. The four-story PS 144 annex, which is expected to be complete in September 2019, will contain 26 classrooms, a playground, a cafeteria and dining room, as well as additional office facilities. The existing building was also renovated to be ADA-accessible.

Grades
The school encompasses grades pre-kindergarten to fifth grade. It has two full day pre-kindergarten classes.  There are 4-7 classes in every other grade.  Each grade has technology, science, physical education (referred to as gym in most of the classrooms if not all), art, math, and literacy.  The fifth grade takes ballroom dancing classes.

The school originally had a sixth grade class. The last sixth grade graduating class was in 2012.

Art
Ballroom Dancing is one of the most popular of the arts among the students in PS 144. Annually, a team is sent to compete in a citywide ballroom dancing competition. The school was featured in Mad Hot Ballroom, a documentary on ballroom dancing among children.

The school has artists who come in and produce pieces of art.  One example of this is the Tiffany designs students made, which is displayed at the Queens Museum of Art.

Rankings
As of 2014, the statewide rank of PS 144 was #116 among 2,295 elementary schools (94.9% NY State percentile) in the New York Elementary School Rankings of School Digger. In the same year, it also received a 10 out of 10 GreatSchools rating.

Parents Association
There is a Parents Association at PS 144.  The website for the Parents Association is www.pa144.com.  The Parents' Association is very active and raises money to pay for extra art, music or theater programs in every grade.

See also
List of public elementary schools in New York City

References

Public elementary schools in Queens, New York
Forest Hills, Queens